A partial list of the tallest architectural structures in Albania, containing all types of structures.

Hydropower dams

Radio masts

Industrial chimneys

References

Tallest
Albania